M. V. V. Satyanarayana is an Indian politician and film producer. He is a member of the 17th Lok Sabha, representing Visakhapatnam constituency of Andhra Pradesh. He is member of the YSR Congress Party.

Filmography

References 

Living people
YSR Congress Party politicians
India MPs 2019–present
Lok Sabha members from Andhra Pradesh
Andhra Pradesh politicians
1966 births
Telugu film producers
Indian film producers
Film producers from Andhra Pradesh
People from West Godavari district